Harry Rothwell (born c. 1930s) is a former Canadian football player who played for the Calgary Stampeders.

References

Living people
1930s births
Canadian football running backs
Calgary Stampeders players